General elections were held in El Salvador on 11 and 13 January 1931. Arturo Araujo won the presidential elections running on a Labor Party-National Republican Party ticket.

Background
Previous elections had usually seen the incumbents choosing their successors, allowing the oligarchy perpetual control of the country's politics. However, on this occasion Pío Romero Bosque failed to designate a successor, resulting in a wide variety of candidates.

Whilst Arajuo obtained a plurality of the votes, he had failed to secure a majority. However, the newly elected Assembly consisted largely of Arajuo supporters, and when convenened on 12 February, allowed him to assume the presidency. However, Araujo, a landowner with progressive ideals, had the misfortune of taking office in the midst of massive labor and student strikes. Martial law was declared, and soon the military, upset about not having received its pay and supported by the oligarchy, which distrusted Araujo, easily overthrew his government after nine months.

Results

President

References

Bibliography
Alvarenga Venutolo, Patricia (1996) Cultura y etica de la violencia San José: EDUCA
Anderson, Thomas P. (1971) Matanza: El Salvador's communist revolt of 1932 Lincoln: University of Nebraska Press
Larde y Larín, Jorge (1958) Guía Histórica de El Salvador San Salvador: Ministerio de Culture
Political Handbook of the world 1931 New York, 1932.
Vidal, Manuel (1970) Nociones de historia de Centro América San Salvador: Ministerio de Educación. Ninth edition

El Salvador
Legislative elections in El Salvador
Presidential
Presidential elections in El Salvador
Election and referendum articles with incomplete results